The 2022 NCAA Division III football season was the component of the 2022 college football season organized by the NCAA at the Division III level in the United States. The regular season began on September 3 and ended on November 12. This was the 49th season that the NCAA has sponsored a Division III championship. 

Mary Hardin–Baylor, the defending national champions, were the top-ranked team to begin the season.

The season's playoffs were played between November 19 and December 16, culminating in the national championship—also known as the Stagg Bowl—at the Navy–Marine Corps Memorial Stadium in Annapolis, Maryland.

Conference changes and new programs

Membership changes

In addition to the above, the USA South amicably split into two conferences at the end of the 2021–22 school year. In addition to Averett, which left for the Old Dominion Athletic Conference, 10 of the previous 19 full members remained in the USA South, and eight left to form the new Collegiate Conference of the South (CCS). Belhaven, which had previously been announced as a new USA South all-sports member for 2021–22, instead joined CCS. Since CCS does not sponsor football, the separation agreement called for all football-sponsoring CCS members to become USA South affiliates. This meant the only changes to USA South football were the arrival of Belhaven and departure of Averett.

Conference standings

Postseason

Teams

Automatic bids (27)

At-large bids (5)

Bracket

* - Host team

See also
2022 NCAA Division I FBS football season
2022 NCAA Division I FCS football season
2022 NCAA Division II football season
2022 NAIA football season

References